Alessio Bertaggia (born July 30, 1993) is a Swiss professional ice hockey player who is currently playing with Genève-Servette HC of the National League (NL).

Playing career
He formerly played junior hockey in North America for the Brandon Wheat Kings and the Spokane Chiefs of the Western Hockey League. He recorded a hat trick in his WHL debut, a 4-1 win over the Moose Jaw Warriors. Undrafted, he returned to Switzerland after two seasons, as he earlier signed for EV Zug of the NLA on a two-year deal on December 19, 2012.

Personal
His father is the former professional hockey player, Sandro Bertaggia, who also played with HC Lugano and had his number retired by the club.

Career statistics

Regular season and playoffs

International

References

External links

1993 births
Living people
Brandon Wheat Kings players
Genève-Servette HC players
HC Lugano players
Spokane Chiefs players
Swiss ice hockey right wingers
Sportspeople from Lugano
EV Zug players